Darrel Cunningham (born January 23, 1948) was a Canadian politician. He served in the Legislative Assembly of Saskatchewan from 1991 to 1995, as a NDP member for the constituency of Canora.

References

Saskatchewan New Democratic Party MLAs
1948 births
Living people
People from Canora, Saskatchewan
People from Kelvington, Saskatchewan